Brigadier William Denis Whitaker,  (February 27, 1915 – May 30, 2001) was a Canadian athlete, soldier, businessman, and author.

Early life
Born in Calgary, Alberta and raised in Toronto, Ontario, Whitaker was educated at the University of Toronto Schools and later at the Royal Military College of Canada, student # 2357 in Kingston, Ontario. He graduated in 1933. He was a quarterback for the Hamilton Tigers of the Ontario Rugby Football Union.

He joined the Canadian Army and accepted a commission, as a second lieutenant with The Royal Hamilton Light Infantry (Wentworth Regiment) in 1937.

Military career
During the Second World War, Whitaker was awarded the Distinguished Service Order at the rank of captain for his achievement in the Dieppe Raid in August 1942. He was the only one of the 100 officers who landed on the beach to fight his way into town and escape unwounded. As a lieutenant colonel, Whitaker commanded the 1st Battalion, The Royal Hamilton Light Infantry–Canadian Army Active from February 17, 1944, until July 17, 1944, and from September 15, 1944, until March 29, 1945, throughout most of the fighting in northwest Europe. On 16 October 1944, during the Battle of the Scheldt, Whitaker took the village of Woensdrecht, which presented particular problems for the Canadians in their advance along the banks of the river Scheldt. He won a second Distinguished Service Order in February 1945 for leadership in the Battle of Goch-Calcar Road during Operation Veritable
.

At the end of the war, he was promoted to the rank of brigadier. Whitaker left the army in 1951, but returned as Honorary Colonel of the Royal Hamilton Light Infantry from 1972 to 1992.

Business career
After his military service, he was a commercial manager of radio station CHML. In 1962, he was named vice-president of O'Keefe Brewing Co. and soon became the president. He was also the president of Major Market Advertising and a financial consultant with Nesbitt Burns.

Sports career
Whitaker's sports career was equally illustrious, beginning with captaincy of the Royal Military College of Canada ice hockey and Canadian football teams. He led the Hamilton Tigers in 1938. He was named to the Canadian Forces Sports Honour Roll and was a national senior squash champion. He chaired the Canadian Equestrian Team for 20 years, and under his guidance the team won two Olympics, 15 Pan-American Games and two World Championship gold medals. He was also chef-de-mission for the 1980 Canadian Olympic Team in Moscow, which the Canadians eventually boycotted, along with the Americans due to the Soviets invading Afghanistan. He was a founder and member of the Olympic Trust of Canada. In 1990, he was inducted into Canada's Sports Hall of Fame.
Denis was one of the founding members of the Hamilton Hunt Club, started in 1958 in Caledonia, Ontario. He was a Master of Foxhounds and rode with the club from 1958 to 1973.

Decorations and honours

 Distinguished Service Order with Bar
 Efficiency Decoration (E.D.)
 Commander of the Order of the Crown (Belgium)
 In 1989, he was named a Member of the Order of Canada.
 In April 1995, the French government awarded Whitaker the Order of the Legion of Honour for his role in the liberation of France.

Selected works
 Normandy: The Real Story of How Ordinary Allied Soldiers Defeated Hitler by Denis Whitaker, Shelagh Whitaker, and Terry Copp
 Victory at Falaise: The Soldier's Story by Denis Whitaker and Shelagh Whitaker with Terry Copp
 Tug of War: The Allied Victory That Opened Antwerp by Denis Whitaker and Shelagh Whitaker
 Dieppe: Tragedy to Triumph by Denis Whitaker and Shelagh Whitaker
 Rhineland: The Battle to End the War by Denis Whitaker and Shelagh Whitaker, 1989
 in German: Endkampf am Rhein. Transl. Ute Spengler. Ullstein, Berlin 1991
 The Battle of the Scheldt by Denis Whitaker

References

1915 births
2001 deaths
Sportspeople from Calgary
Canadian football people from Toronto
Royal Hamilton Light Infantry (Wentworth Regiment)
Royal Hamilton Light Infantry (Wentworth Regiment) officers
Businesspeople from Calgary
Businesspeople from Toronto
Writers from Calgary
Writers from Toronto
Canadian people of German descent
Canadian people of English descent
Canadian military historians
Canadian male non-fiction writers
Historians of World War II
Players of Canadian football from Ontario
Players of Canadian football from Alberta
Hamilton Tigers football players
Masters of foxhounds in Canada
Ontario Rugby Football Union players

Members of the Order of Canada
Canadian Companions of the Distinguished Service Order
Commanders of the Order of the Crown (Belgium)
Royal Military College of Canada alumni
20th-century Canadian businesspeople
20th-century Canadian non-fiction writers
Canadian Army personnel of World War II
Canadian military personnel from Alberta